Ardmore (Scottish Gaelic: An Àird Mhòr) is a village on the south shore of Dornoch Firth in Tain, Ross-shire, Highland and is in the Scottish council area of Highland.

References

Populated places in Ross and Cromarty